Roemer Vlacq may refer to:
 Roemer Vlacq (1637–1703), a Dutch naval captain in the 17th century
 Roemer Vlacq (1712–1774), a Dutch vice admiral in the 18th century